is a railway station in the town of Sannohe in the Sannohe District of Aomori Prefecture, Japan. It is operated by the third sector railway operators Aoimori Railway Company and Iwate Galaxy Railway Company.

Location
Metoki Station is the southern terminus of the Aoimori Railway Line, and is 121.9 kilometers from the northern terminus of the line at Aomori Station. It is also the northern terminus of the Iwate Galaxy Railway Line, and is 82.0 kilometers from the southern terminus at Morioka Station. It is 622.8 kilometers from Tokyo Station.

Surrounding area
Mabechi River

Station layout
Metoki Station has two opposed side platforms serving two tracks, connected to the station building by a footbridge. The station building is relatively large, but is unattended.

Platforms

History
Metoki Station opened on 20 December 1924 as the Metoki Signal Stop on the Tōhoku Main Line on the Japanese National Railways (JNR). It was elevated to the status of a full station on 1 October 1948. Freight operations were discontinued from April 1962. With the privatization of the JNR on 1 April 1987, it came under the operational control of JR East. It came under the joint control of the Aoimori Railway and the Iwate Galaxy Railway Company on 1 December 2002.

Services
In fiscal 2018, the station was used by an average of 423 passengers daily.

See also
List of railway stations in Japan

References

External links	

Aoimori Railway station information page 

Railway stations in Japan opened in 1948
Railway stations in Aomori Prefecture
Aoimori Railway Line
Sannohe, Aomori
Iwate Galaxy Railway Line